, or MHCB, was the corporate and investment banking subsidiary of Mizuho Financial Group, the second-biggest Japanese financial services conglomerate, prior to the reintegration of investment banking services under the Mizuho Bank name in July 2013.

History
MHCB was created in April 2002 by the merger of the Dai-Ichi Kangyo Bank and Fuji Bank's corporate and investment banking division with the Industrial Bank of Japan. Backed by Mizuho Financial Group's credit ratings and financial solidity, MHCB was positioned as a major player in financial markets and among Japan's leading corporate and investment banks by market share. The brokerage arm Mizuho Securities was also a primary dealer in the U.S. Treasury securities market. MHCB opened a branch in Wuxi, China in 2006 in a bid to support transactions with Japanese companies operating in the city. The bank also had a branch in the Philippines, partnering with the Bank of the Philippine Islands. In 2013, it merged with the former Mizuho Bank, with the unified institution being "Mizuho Bank".

Shareholders
Mizuho Financial Group (100%)

See also

Mizuho Financial Group
Mizuho Bank
Industrial Bank of Japan

References

External links
 

Banks of Japan
Investment banks of Japan
Conglomerate companies based in Tokyo
Financial services companies based in Tokyo
Corporate Bank
Fuyo Group
Furukawa Group
Banks established in 1893
Japanese companies established in 1893